The Texas Eagle was an American streamlined passenger train operated by the Missouri Pacific Railroad and the Texas and Pacific Railway between St. Louis, Missouri, and multiple destinations in the state of Texas. It operated from 1948 to 1971. The Texas Eagle was one of many trains discontinued when Amtrak began operations in 1971, although Amtrak would revive service over the Missouri Pacific with the Inter-American in 1974. This train was renamed the Eagle in 1981 and finally the Texas Eagle in 1988.

History 

The Texas Eagle began on August 15, 1948, with the renaming of the Sunshine Special. For thirteen years, the Texas Eagle operated as two separate sections, leaving St. Louis in the late afternoon, one following behind the other at an approximately 10-minute interval.  At Longview, the routes diverged. The west Texas section continued to Dallas and El Paso, while the south Texas section split off cars for Houston and Galveston at Palestine, then operated to Austin and San Antonio. In 1952, dome cars were added to the train. After 1961, the Texas Eagle was consolidated as a single, very long train, between St. Louis and Longview, Texas, where the train was split into several sections, each serving different Texas cities.  The west Texas section (the West Texas Eagle) of the Texas Eagle continued from Longview to Dallas, Fort Worth, and El Paso; the south Texas section (South Texas Eagle) served Palestine, Austin, San Antonio, and Laredo. A third section of the Texas Eagle split from the main train at Palestine, providing service to Houston.

While at its northern end, the Texas Eagle served St. Louis, as noted above, it also had another section that split off at Little Rock, going east towards Memphis.

On December 12, 1948, a few months after its inception the Texas Eagle carried through sleepers from the Pennsylvania Railroad's Penn Texas, providing a one-seat ride from Washington, D.C. and New York City to Texas. Through sleeper service ended on June 30, 1961, but it was still possible to make a connection between the two trains in St. Louis.

The western section ended May 31, 1969, leaving a San Antonio–St. Louis service. The Missouri Pacific discontinued the remaining Texas intrastate segment of the Texas Eagle on September 22, 1970. The Missouri Pacific bypassed the Interstate Commerce Commission by arguing (to the Texas Railroad Commission) that the "Texas Eagle" was not an interstate train but rather three intrastate trains: one which ran San Antonio–Texarkana, another which ran from Texarkana to the Missouri border, and a third which ran from the Missouri border to St. Louis. The Texas Railroad Commission accepted this argument and permitted the Missouri Pacific to end the Texas portion of the Texas Eagle. The Texas Railroad Commission ruling was handed down less than a month before President Nixon signed Railpax legislation which placed a moratorium on passenger train discontinuances in anticipation of the start-up of Amtrak. The St. Louis–Texarkana truncation of the Texas Eagle continued running until the advent of Amtrak on May 1, 1971, when it was discontinued.

International service
From its beginning, into the latter 1960s, the South Texas Eagle had cars that continued from Laredo, Texas, where a connection was made to the Aztec Eagle for Nuevo Laredo and Mexico City, operated by the Ferrocarriles Nacionales de México. Likewise, there were through Pullman sleepers continuing to Mexico City.

Sample consist 
The December 1952 edition of the Official Guide of the Railways listed the following for a southbound Texas Eagle:

See also 
Penn Texas, a connecting Pennsylvania Railroad service from St. Louis' Union Station
Texas Eagle, a successor service operated by Amtrak

External links
 The Far-Ranging Texas Eagle - description at American Rails
December 1960 Missouri Pacific timetable

References 

International named passenger trains
Named passenger trains of the United States
Night trains of the United States
Passenger trains of the Missouri Pacific Railroad
Passenger trains of the Texas and Pacific Railway
Passenger rail transportation in Arkansas
Passenger rail transportation in Missouri
Passenger rail transportation in Oklahoma
Passenger rail transportation in Tennessee
Passenger rail transportation in Texas

Railway services introduced in 1948
Railway services discontinued in 1971